Preston Friary was a friary in Lancashire, England.

Burials
Robert Holland, 1st Baron Holand
Sr Thurstan De Holland (1220-1275)
Sr Robert De Holland (d. 1242)

References

Monasteries in Lancashire
Buildings and structures in Preston